Liliana Zagacka (born January 28, 1977 in Góra Śląska) is a Polish triple jumper.

She finished ninth in long jump at the 2002 European Championships. She also competed at the 2001 World Championships and the 2004 Olympic Games without reaching the finals.

Her personal best jump is 14.22 metres, achieved in July 2001 in Biała Podlaska. This was the Polish record until 2010.

Competition record

References
 

1977 births
Living people
Polish female triple jumpers
Athletes (track and field) at the 2004 Summer Olympics
Olympic athletes of Poland
People from Góra
Sportspeople from Lower Silesian Voivodeship